Rodelio Astudillo is an American photographer, best known for the celebrity photobooth, where he has taken thousands of photographs of hundreds of the world's best known television and movie personalities in a simulated photobooth, getting celebrities such as Matthew McConaughey, Benedict Cumberbatch, Uma Thurman, the casts of The Sopranos, The Office (U.S.), directors Ang Lee and The Lord of the Rings director Peter Jackson, and even astronaut Buzz Aldrin to ham it up for him.

Early life 
Astudillo was born and grew up in Los Angeles California, though he lived throughout the Eastern United States, including Upstate New York, Indiana, Missouri. He studied English literature in college and was an avid surfer and diver, interests he picked up while attending the combat diver course at the United States Naval Air Station, Trumbo Point Annex, Key West, Florida, while in the military.

Astudillo left school twice to join the army before graduating, where he served in a reconnaissance platoon of a U.S. Army Ranger Regimental Detachment (RRD) based out of Fort Bragg, North Carolina. He declined re-enlistment after his last combat-related injuries, earning the rank of staff sergeant, but ironically found himself back in various war zones when he served as a war photographer for the following two years.

While in college, Astudillo was influenced by a black-and-white photography class taught by the University's then Art Department Chair, Richard Ross, the principal photographer for the Getty Conservation Institute. After further encouragement by Ross and the subsequent color photography course, Astudillo was determined to become a photographer, even if self-taught.

After graduating from college, Astudillo held a series of jobs, including work as a bounty hunter, a consultant, and a combat photographer. After considering employment in Blackwater USA, Astudillo decided to finish his studies.

Photography
Astudillo began working as a war photographer for nearly two years, where he was wounded on more than one occasion. He has documented a variety of armed conflicts, spending time in Latin America, Europe and the Middle East.

Astudillo's experiences in the military profoundly influenced his early photography, drawn to social issues which included stories on gang violence, the homeless, and Hollywood vice. He moved into mainstream photography only after a series of close calls while on assignment in the Middle East conflict, switching to magazine editorial and still photography, although the eclecticism remained, from his photo series on the Los Angeles Coroner's Office morgue in downtown Los Angeles, to the photo story of a multi-national skinhead wedding in San Francisco, California.

He began shooting reportage photography for a number of entertainment magazines and studios using his photojournalism experience. His celebrity photography includes portraiture, often using a single source of light, an influence of one of his favorite photographers, celebrity and fashion photographer, Robert Maxwell. One of the highlights of his career was the opportunity to photograph Maxwell in the photobooth.

Astudillo's other photographic influences  include instruction by photographer Richard Ross at the University of California, Santa Barbara, Charles Biasini, Elliott Erwitt, Guy Bourdin, Sean Ellis, Richard Avedon, Duane Michals, Patrick Demarchelier, Annie Leibovitz, James Nachtwey, Eddie Adams and the encouragement of his ranger detachment SRS, Sapu Maiava, and that of his brother, Godofredo Astudillo, a filmmaker and photo editor.

Notes and references

Grey's Anatomy Candid Camera. In: TV Guide (USA), Vol. 54, No. July 27, 3, 2006, Pg. 24–27

External links
 Official website
 Contour by Getty photo agency
 Apple Aperture Article

1988 births
Living people
American photojournalists
War photographers
Artists from Los Angeles
Filipino emigrants to the United States
Photographers from California